NASCAR Racing 2003 Season, or NR2003 for short, is a computer racing simulator released in February 2003 by Papyrus Design Group for Windows and Mac OS X. The game was the last to be released by the company before EA Sports bought the NASCAR license exclusively from 2004 to 2009 (parent company Sierra's successor company, Activision Blizzard, reacquired NASCAR rights in 2011, with NASCAR The Game: 2011). The game included all of the 2003 NASCAR season tracks and many of the drivers, including Dave Blaney, who was absent in NASCAR Thunder 2004.

Gameplay
NASCAR Racing 2003 Season contains 40 Winston Cup teams that were anticipated to run throughout the season, with the exception of the cars from Chip Ganassi Racing, as well as 23 Winston Cup series tracks, putting the player behind the wheel of a NASCAR stock car. Players are able to choose between testing sessions, offline single racing, championship, and multiplayer options as well as car setup choices.

Ownership
At the end of March 2004, NR2003 was pulled from shelves when Electronic Arts acquired the exclusive NASCAR rights. In May 2004, Papyrus was shut down, and David Kaemmer bought the source code and assets a couple months later for his company FIRST, LLC where it became the base code for iRacing. In 2007, Sierra, the game's publishers, shut down the online servers.

Reception

The game received "generally favorable reviews", according to the review aggregation website Metacritic.

According to Edge, the game sold at least 100,000 copies in the United States, but was beaten by NASCAR Racing 4s 260,000 sales in the region. Total US sales of NASCAR Racing computer games released in the 2000s reached 900,000 copies by August 2006.

The game won PC Gamer USs 2003 "Best Racing Game" award. The magazine's Andy Mahood wrote that it "established a daunting new standard for PC racing simulations that may take years to eclipse".

References

External links
 

2003 video games
MacOS games
Multiplayer and single-player video games
NASCAR video games
Papyrus Design Group games
Racing simulators
Racing video games
Sierra Entertainment games
Video games developed in the United States
Windows games